Lo Pan Temple is a temple located in Kennedy Town, Hong Kong Island, Hong Kong dedicated to Lo Pan (also transliterated as "Lu Ban"), the patron saint of Chinese builders and contractors.

First built in 1884, it is now classified as a Grade I historic building, and is also part of the Central and Western Heritage Trail-The Western District and the Peak Route.

Lo Pan (Lu Ban)
Lu Ban was a Chinese carpenter, engineer, philosopher, inventor, military thinker, statesman who lived during the Spring and Autumn period of China. Lo Pan was deified as a god, and is the patron deity of Chinese builders and contractors. According to folk legend, he was born with a huge flock of cranes spiralling above his home and his room full of a special fragrance. He was therefore conceived as a celestial being. His festival falls on the 13th day of the sixth month of the Lunar Calendar.

Temple history
Located at 15 Ching Lin Terrace, the temple is the only urban temple in Hong Kong erected to commemorate Lo Pan. It was built by the Contractors Guild in 1884 with donations from many people connected with the trade. According to the record of a stone curving inside the temple, over 1172 people from different towns in Guangdong joined together to donate money for the establishment of Lo Pan Temple.

The ownership of the land on which the temple was built has changed several times over the years, and in 1921 it was acquired by the Kwong Yuet Tong, which is currently the management body of the temple. In 1949, Kwong Yuet Tong was registered as a legal entity to manage the Temple. The staff of Kwong Yuet Tong mainly consists of the builders in Hong Kong.

Although there are several temples on the mainland China that are dedicated to Lo Pan, they are usually dedicated to Lo Pan along with other deities; Lo Pan Temple in Hong Kong pays tribute solely to Lo Pan. Although repair and maintenance work is often carried out, the Temple generally remains as its original appearance and structure. In 1949, an office of Kwong Yuet Tong and Hong Wah Secondary School were built on the vacant land next to the Temple.

Architectural style
The Temple is a two-hall structure, with an unusual jagged roof, elaborate "fire" type parapet walls, clay sculptural figures, relieves and paintings inside and outside the Temple. It is the Chinese temple with the largest number of wall-paintings on Hong Kong Island.

Wall-paintings
Lo Pan Temple is known for its diverse murals filled with traditional Chinese Cultural style depicting different people, insects, animals, flowers and landscapes such as butterflies and narcissi, rowing a boat, Chibi night map, visiting friends, ladies next to the rock, etc. Different styles of calligraphy are incorporated into the wall-paintings to serve as captions.

Clay sculpture
Having different clay sculpture on the walls is one of the unique characteristics of Lo Pan Temple since it is difficult to find clay sculptures in the temples on Hong Kong Island. Those sculptures can be found on the wall and gable of the Temple. The theme of the sculptures are mainly about some Chinese history and mythology. For example, inside the Temple, there is a clay sculpture of one famous Chinese mythology "Historical Romance"() on the left wall. There are also clay sculptures of plants, animals, etc. around the Temple.

Stone carvings
Inside the temple, there is a stone curving which is the oldest antique established in the Qing dynasty. It records the purpose of building this temple – to commemorate Lo Pan as the god of Chinese Architecture and to remind descendants to think of the origin.

Autography
On the two sides of the main door, there are engravings of Chinese poems which praise the contribution of Lo Pan in Architecture and wish his spirit can last forever.

Lo Pan Festival
On the 13th day of the sixth month of every Lunar Calendar, the birthday of Lo Pan, Kwong Yuet Tong celebrates Lo Pan Festival. Meals are distributed to celebrate the Festival. Many builders participate in the pilgrimage up the 200 steps from Belcher's Street to pray for working safely and smoothly. Builders and the Government also donate money for the upkeep of the Temple.

Besides, Lion dance and dragon dance are performed outside the Temple for entertainment and a ceremony is held by the Labour and Welfare Bureau to award the builders with outstanding performance to encourage the improvement of skills within the construction industry.

Apart from the celebration, Taoist priests are invited to comfort the deceased by chanting prayers inside the Temple.

See also
 Lo Pan (Lu Ban)
List of Grade I historic buildings in Hong Kong

References

External links

Hong Kong Temple-Lo Pan Temple
The 125th Anniversary of Lo Pan Temple
King's College and Lo Pan Temple are declared monument as a Grade I historic building
Lo Pan Temple on Heritage Trial
Lo Pan Festival
 The Temple Trail entry about Lo Pan Temple, including a floor plan
 Antiquities Advisory Board. Historic Building Appraisal. Lo Pan Temple, No. 15 Ching Lin Terrace Pictures

Taoist temples in Hong Kong
Grade I historic buildings in Hong Kong
Kennedy Town